Ashetscolex is a genus of lower Ordovician palaeoscolecid.

References 

Prehistoric protostome genera
Paleoscolecids